Cemesto is a sturdy, light-weight, waterproof and fire-resistant composite building material made from a core of sugar cane fiber insulating board surfaced on both sides with asbestos and cement. Its name is a portmanteau word combining "cem" from "cement" and "esto" from "asbestos." A type of prefabricated home using this material came to be called cemestos.

Cemesto was introduced by the Celotex Corporation in 1937. Each  by  panel weighs just . Cemesto was used primarily for interior and exterior walls.

The John B. Pierce Foundation and Celotex collaborated to develop a prefabrication system for building low-cost housing using cemesto panels, in which single cemesto panels were slid horizontally into light wooden frames to create walls. A prototype cemesto house was displayed at the 1939 World's Fair in New York City. The Pierce system was first used in 1941 for building employee housing at the Glenn L. Martin Aircraft Company near Baltimore, Maryland. In 1941 a total of 600 homes were built at Aero Acres using this design.

During World War II, when other building materials were in short supply, cemesto was used extensively in the United States.  Cemesto was used to build temporary office buildings in Washington, D.C. Skidmore, Owings, and Merrill adapted the Pierce system and used cemesto panels for the designs of some 2,500 pre-fabricated homes, known by the nickname "cemestos," erected in Oak Ridge, Tennessee, to house Manhattan Project workers and their families. In 1942 the U.S. Farm Security Administration built 400 cemesto homes in Maryland at a site alongside Aero Acres.

During the 1940s, the manufacturer of cemesto touted it as a material that would in the future make it possible to mass-produce housing at a low cost. One use of the material during the post-war era was in the late 1940s in Circle Pines, Minnesota, where cemesto panels were used in building the first homes in what was envisioned to be a cooperative housing community for people of color. The use of cemesto in Circle Pines came to be regarded as substandard construction, as the builders failed to adequately seal the joints between cemesto panels.

Several prominent architects embraced cemesto as a modern material and used it in their designs. For the Bousquet-Wightman House in Houston, Texas, built in 1941, architect Donald Barthelme used cemesto panels for exterior sheathing. In 1949 Edward Durell Stone called for cemesto panels in the design of a home to be built in Armonk, New York. That same year, Charles Eames designed his Eames House, Case Study House #8, to use brightly painted and unfinished Cemesto panels in a prefabricated steel frame.  Frank Lloyd Wright designed the Raymond Carlson House in Phoenix, Arizona, built in 1950, to use a structural system of wood posts and cemesto boards. In the Arthur Pieper House in Paradise Valley, Arizona, built in 1952 from concrete block, Wright used cemesto for the ceilings.

In addition to houses and office buildings, cemesto was used to build gasoline stations and factories.

References

Building materials
Composite materials